Sada-e-Umeed (En: call of hope) is an organization for children with  disabilities in Khanewal, Pakistan. Khanewal, a Christian colony founded in 1970, is 500 kilometers south of Islamabad. It is an initiative of the Roman Catholic Diocese of Multan.

Two Little Sisters of Jesus, Sister Cecilia, a Belgian missionary, and Pakistani Sister Zeenat started the project in 1995 and handed it over to lay people after 10 years. Sada-e-umeed got registration under the Societies Act in 2005 and has an independent board of directors.  Mr. Francis Daniel is the chairman of the board.

On December 3, 2008, Sister Cecilia asked 200 people at a function marking the International Day of Persons with Disabilities, to be more generous with their time and money.

The program included a puppet show, speeches, tableaus and singing by handicapped children. The performers were mainly from rehabilitation centers under the Sada-e-Umeed organization.

The organization runs a primary school and three centers for handicapped children in the Punjab province. The primary school for Inclusive Education was formed for special children, dropouts, overage youths and slow learners

Three of the original six centers had to shut down in 2007 for lack of funds. Aamir Younis is the executive director of the organization. The other three stayed open but had to close their residential facilities and now serve 150 children and youths up to the age of 24. They provide rehabilitation services and basic skills training for youngsters who are not able to attend regular school.

The Catholic Church does not assist them financially and even the Catholic Relief Services stopped assistance in 2005. The centers are housed in rented buildings and depend on donations from local donors and foreign benefactors, but carry an operating deficit.

Each center needs at least 3,000 rupees (US$38) for rent and utilities per month. Additional funds are required for center workers to travel to remote villages to visit homes with disabled children and provide them physiotherapy, take them to hospitals for medical checkups and help parents.

The centers are located in a troubled area. In 1997, 16 churches and hundreds of houses of Christians were ransacked, looted, burnt, and destroyed in Khanewal district of the Roman Catholic Diocese of Multan.

References

Social welfare charities
Catholic Church in Pakistan
Disability in Pakistan
Charities based in Pakistan